Hurlingham Partido is a partido of Buenos Aires Province, Argentina. It is in the Greater Buenos Aires urban area.

Hurlingham is known for the Hurlingham Club, a sports and polo club named after the Hurlingham Club in Fulham, England.

Districts
Hurlingham, Buenos Aires
William C. Morris, Buenos Aires 
Villa Tesei

References

External links

 

 
1994 establishments in Argentina
Partidos of Buenos Aires Province